The Terry Sawchuk Trophy was an annual award presented by the Central Hockey League to recognize the top goaltenders on the league's best defensive team. The trophy was given to the goaltender(s) of the team allowing the fewest goals during the regular season. 

Established for the 1976–77 season, the award was named to honor the late Terry Sawchuk.

Winners

References

Central Professional Hockey League trophies and awards